Ulyap is a rural locality (an aul) and the administrative center of Ulyapskoye Rural Settlement of Krasnogvardeysky District, Adygea, Russia. The population was 1,186 in 2018. There are 20 streets.

Geography 
Ulyap is located 33 km southeast of Krasnogvardeyskoye (the district's administrative centre) by road. Shturbino is the nearest rural locality.

Ethnicity 
The aul is inhabited by Adyghes.

References 

Rural localities in Krasnogvardeysky District